(born January 26, 1968 in Nagoya, Aichi Prefecture, Japan), is an actress and model. She graduated from the private Horikoshi High School, and made her film debut in the 1983 release Aiko 16-sai, and was selected as the 11th Clarion Girl in 1985. She has also released nude photo books and appeared in the Japanese edition of Playboy.

In 1996, Miyazaki married and ceased work on her entertainment career. She now lives in the United States where she is a housewife and a lecturer. She resumed work as an entertainer in 2005. In November of that same year, Miyazaki announced that she had breast cancer.

Filmography
Aiko 16-sai (1983)
Be-Bop High School (1985, Toei)
Be-bop High School: Kōkō Yotarō Aika (1986, Toei)
Be-bop High School: Kōkō Yotarō Kōshinkyoku (1987, Toei)
Be-bop High School: Kōkō Yotarō Kyōsōkyoku (1987, Toei)
Be-bop High School: Kōkō Yotarō Ondo (1988, Toei)
Be-bop High School: Kōkō Yotarō Kanketsuhen (1988, Toei)
Fuyu Monogatari (1989, Toho)
Zazie (1989)
Black Princess: Jigoku no Tenshi (1990)
Fūsen (1990)
Isan Sōzoku (1990)
Black Princess 2: Honō no Hyōteki (1991)
Yumeji (1991)
Yaneura no Sanpōsha (1992)
Kokkai e Ikō (1993)
Oedipus no Kyōjū (1993)
XX Utsukushiki Kyōki (1993)
Shingokudō no Tsuma-tachi: Horetara Jigoku (1994)
Yaneura no Sanpōsha (1994)
Sharaku (1995)
Strange Circus (2005)

Television
Tsūkai! OL Dōri (1986, TBS)
Chocchan (1987, NHK)
Takeda Shingen (1988, NHK), Ran
Tokimeki Zakari (1988, Fuji TV)
Nihon'ichi no Kattobu Otoko (1990, Fuji TV)
Taiheiki (1991, NHK)
Zutto Anata ga Suki Datta (1992, TBS)
Shinkansen Monogatari '93 Natsu (1993, TBS)
Uramiya Honpo (2006, TV Tokyo)
Teppan Shōjo Akane (2006, TBS network)

Commercials
Seiko Epson "Wordbank LXT" (1988)
Lion "Marine Fresh" (1988)
Shiseido "Fairwind Pact" (1988)
Shiseido summer campaign (1989)
Hitachi IC "Office Processor" (1990)
Japan Ad Council "Early stage breast cancer mammography examination" (from 2006)

Sources:

Books
XX-Holy Body
XXX

References

External links
 Mothers' Spirit (official site)

 宮崎萬純さんが乳がんを公表

1968 births
Living people
People from Nagoya
Japanese idols
Horikoshi High School alumni
20th-century Japanese actresses
21st-century Japanese actresses